Ramsay is a single-member electoral district for the South Australian House of Assembly. It is named after Alexander Ramsay, who was general manager of the South Australian Housing Trust for 25 years. It is a 24.7 km² suburban electorate north of Adelaide—based on the angle between Main North Road and the Port Wakefield Road, Ramsay covers the outer northern Adelaide suburbs of Paralowie, Salisbury, Salisbury Downs and Salisbury Plain, as well as part of Salisbury North.

Ramsay was first contested at the 1985 election. Two of three representatives of the electorate have served as Premier of South Australia. It is a safe Labor seat, with the fifth-largest Labor margin in the state at the 1997 election, second-largest at the 2002 election, and largest at the 2006 election where Labor won 71.5 percent of the first preference vote and 78.5 percent of the two-party vote, and the largest at the 2010 election. A 2012 Ramsay by-election occurred on 11 February as a result of Mike Rann's resignation from parliament, Labor easily retained the seat and maintained the largest Labor seat margin. It had the second largest margin following the 2014 election.

Members for Ramsay

Election results

Notes

References
 ECSA profile for Ramsay: 2018
 ABC profile for Ramsay: 2018
 Poll Bludger profile for Ramsay: 2018

1985 establishments in Australia
Electoral districts of South Australia